Paul L. Anderson (1946 – March 23, 2018) was a member of the Church of Jesus Christ of Latter-day Saints (LDS Church). He was an architectural historian, museum curator and hymnwriter.

Anderson was born in Pasadena, California, and as a young man served a mission for the LDS Church in Japan.

Anderson received a B.A. with honors from Stanford University in 1968 and a Master of Architecture from Princeton University in 1972. He was an architect in Pasadena, California, and received his license in 1976.

Anderson married the historian Lavina Fielding in 1977. They lived in Salt Lake City, Utah, and had one son, Christian, who was born in 1980. During the 1993 conflict between some intellectuals and LDS Church leadership (in which Lavina was excommunicated), Paul publicly called for peace and reconciliation between the parties.

In 1973, Anderson received a fellowship from the LDS Church's Historical Department to study historical Mormon architecture, which led to a position restoring the church's historic buildings. He helped in the planning of the Museum of Church History and Art, which opened in 1984, and later in designing its exhibits. He helped launch the Brigham Young University Museum of Art in 1992 and then served as head of design and curator.  Anderson was heavily involved with the work of Nauvoo Restoration, Inc.

Anderson had been a longtime member of the Mormon History Association (MHA), and planned its 1987 conference in England, for which he was awarded a Special Citation from the MHA. He served as MHA president from 2007 to 2008.

Anderson also had a strong musical interest. For several years he sang in the Utah Symphony Chorus. He wrote the text of four hymns in the 1985 LDS hymnbook: numbers 139, "In Fasting We Approach Thee"; 148, "Sabbath Day"; 291, "Turn Your Hearts"; and 311, "We Meet Again as Sisters".

Anderson died on March 23, 2018, from a heart attack.

Notes

References 
 listing of Mormon Historical Association committee members
 Karen Lynn Davidson. Stories of our Latter-day Saint Hymns. (Salt Lake City: Deseret Book, 1988) p. 341.
 "Nauvoo Symposium Held at Brigham Young University" Ensign, November 1989 , pp. 109–11.
 Hymns of The Church of Jesus Christ of Latter-day Saints, 1985.

External links
 

1946 births
2018 deaths
20th-century American architects
American Latter Day Saint hymnwriters
American Mormon missionaries in Japan
Brigham Young University staff
Historians of the Latter Day Saint movement
Writers from Pasadena, California
Writers from Salt Lake City
Princeton University School of Architecture alumni
Stanford University alumni
20th-century Mormon missionaries
Architects from Pasadena, California
Latter Day Saints from California
Latter Day Saints from New Jersey
Latter Day Saints from Utah